|}

This is a list of House of Assembly results for the 1959 South Australian state election.

Results by electoral district

Adelaide 

 Two candidate preferred vote was estimated.

Albert

Alexandra

Angas

Barossa

Burnside 

 Preferences were not distributed.

Burra

Chaffey

Edwardstown 

 Two party preferred vote was estimated.

Enfield 

 Preferences were not distributed.

Eyre

Flinders

Frome 

 Two party preferred vote was estimated.

Gawler

Glenelg 

 Two party preferred vote was estimated.

Gouger 

 Preferences were not distributed.

Gumeracha 

 Two party preferred vote was estimated.

Hindmarsh

Light

Millicent

Mitcham 

 The two party preferred vote was estimated.

Mount Gambier

Murray 

 Two party preferred vote was estimated.

Norwood 

 Two party preferred vote was estimated.

Onkaparinga

Port Adelaide 

 Two candidate preferred vote was estimated.

Port Pirie 

 Preferences were not distributed.

Ridley

Rocky River

Semaphore

Stirling

Stuart

Torrens 

 Two party preferred vote was estimated.

Unley 

 Two party preferred vote was estimated.

Victoria 

 Two party preferred vote was estimated.

Wallaroo

West Torrens 

 Two party preferred vote was estimated.

Whyalla

Yorke Peninsula

See also
 Candidates of the 1959 South Australian state election
 Members of the South Australian House of Assembly, 1959–1962

References

1959
1959 elections in Australia
1950s in South Australia